This page lists all described species of the spider family Filistatidae accepted by the World Spider Catalog :

A

Afrofilistata

Afrofilistata Benoit, 1968
 A. fradei (Berland & Millot, 1940) (type) — West, Central Africa, Sudan

Andoharano

Andoharano Lehtinen, 1967
 A. ansieae Zonstein & Marusik, 2015 — Namibia
 A. decaryi (Fage, 1945) (type) — Madagascar
 A. grandidieri (Simon, 1901) — Madagascar
 A. griswoldi Magalhaes & Grismado, 2019 — Madagascar
 A. lehtineni Magalhaes & Grismado, 2019 — Madagascar
 A. milloti Legendre, 1972 — Madagascar
 A. monodi Legendre, 1972 — Madagascar
 A. ramirezi Magalhaes & Grismado, 2019 — Madagascar
 A. rollardae Magalhaes & Grismado, 2019 — Madagascar
 A. simoni Magalhaes & Grismado, 2019 — Madagascar
 A. woodae Magalhaes & Grismado, 2019 — Madagascar
 A. zonsteini Magalhaes & Grismado, 2019 — Madagascar

Antilloides

Antilloides Brescovit, Sánchez-Ruiz & Alayón, 2016
 A. abeli Brescovit, Sánchez-Ruiz & Alayón, 2016 (type) — Cuba
 A. chupacabras Magalhaes, 2018 — Mexico
 A. cubitas Brescovit, Sánchez-Ruiz & Alayón, 2016 — Cuba
 A. haitises Brescovit, Sánchez-Ruiz & Alayón, 2016 — Dominican Rep.
 A. mesoliticus Brescovit, Sánchez-Ruiz & Alayón, 2016 — Cuba
 A. zozo Brescovit, Sánchez-Ruiz & Alayón, 2016 — Virgin Is., Puerto Rico

F

Filistata

Filistata Latreille, 1810
Filistata albens Zonstein & Marusik, 2019 – Israel
Filistata balouchi Zamani & Marusik, 2020 – Iran
Filistata betarif (Magalhaes, Aharon, Ganem & Gavish-Regev, 2022) – Israel
Filistata canariensis Schmidt, 1976 – Canary Is.
Filistata gomerensis Wunderlich, 1992 – Canary Is.
Filistata hasselti Simon, 1906 – Indonesia (Java?)
Filistata insidiatrix (Forsskål, 1775) (type) – Cape Verde Is., Mediterranean to Turkmenistan
Filistata lehtineni Marusik & Zonstein, 2014 – Azerbaijan, Iran
Filistata lubinae Zonstein & Marusik, 2019 – Israel
Filistata maguirei Marusik & Zamani, 2015 – Iran
Filistata pseudogomerensis Wunderlich, 1992 – Canary Is.
Filistata pygmaea Zonstein, Marusik & Grabolle, 2018 – Portugal
Filistata teideensis Wunderlich, 1992 – Canary Is.
Filistata wunderlichi Zonstein & Marusik, 2019 – Spain

Filistatinella

Filistatinella Gertsch & Ivie, 1936
 F. chilindrina Magalhaes & Ramírez, 2017 — Mexico
 F. crassipalpis (Gertsch, 1935) (type) — USA
 F. domestica Desales-Lara, 2012 — Mexico
 F. hermosa Magalhaes & Ramírez, 2017 — USA
 F. howdyall Magalhaes & Ramírez, 2017 — USA
 F. kahloae Magalhaes & Ramírez, 2017 — Mexico
 F. palaciosi Jiménez & Palacios-Cardiel, 2012 — Mexico
 F. pistrix Magalhaes & Ramírez, 2017 — USA
 F. spatulata Magalhaes & Ramírez, 2017 — USA, Mexico
 F. tohono Magalhaes & Ramírez, 2017 — USA

Filistatoides

Filistatoides F. O. Pickard-Cambridge, 1899
 F. insignis (O. Pickard-Cambridge, 1896) (type) — Mexico, Guatemala
 F. milloti (Zapfe, 1961) — Chile
 F. polita (Franganillo, 1936) — Cuba
 F. xichu Brescovit, Sánchez-Ruiz & Alayón, 2016 — Mexico

K

Kukulcania

Kukulcania Lehtinen, 1967
 K. arizonica (Chamberlin & Ivie, 1935) — USA, Mexico
 K. bajacali Magalhaes & Ramírez, 2019 — Mexico
 K. benita Magalhaes & Ramírez, 2019 — Mexico (San Benito Is., Baja California)
 K. brignolii (Alayón, 1981) — Mexico
 K. chingona Magalhaes & Ramírez, 2019 — Mexico
 K. cochimi Magalhaes & Ramírez, 2019 — Mexico
 K. geophila (Chamberlin & Ivie, 1935) — USA, Mexico
 K. gertschi Magalhaes & Ramírez, 2019 — Mexico
 K. hibernalis (Hentz, 1842) (type) — USA, Mexico, Central America, Caribbean, South America. Introduced to Canary Is., Liberia
 K. hurca (Chamberlin & Ivie, 1942) — USA, Mexico
 K. mexicana Magalhaes & Ramírez, 2019 — Mexico
 K. santosi Magalhaes & Ramírez, 2019 — Mexico, El Salvador, Nicaragua, Costa Rica. Probably  introduced in Peru, Chile
 K. tequila Magalhaes & Ramírez, 2019 — Mexico
 K. tractans (O. Pickard-Cambridge, 1896) — Mexico
 K. utahana (Chamberlin & Ivie, 1935) — USA, Mexico

L

Labahitha

Labahitha Zonstein, Marusik & Magalhaes, 2017
 Labahitha fuscata (Nakatsudi, 1943) – Japan (Ogasawara Is.), Brunei, Papua New Guinea, Australia (Queensland), New Caledonia, Palau, Marshall Is., Micronesia, Fiji
 Labahitha garciai (Simon, 1892) – Seychelles, Singapore, Malaysia (Borneo), Philippines, Papua New Guinea
 Labahitha gibsonhilli (Savory, 1943) – Australia (Christmas Is.)
 Labahitha incerta Magalhaes, Berry, Koh & Gray, 2022 – Australia (Queensland)
 Labahitha insularis (Thorell, 1891) – India (Nicobar Is.)
 Labahitha littoralis (Roewer, 1938) – Indonesia (New Guinea)
 Labahitha marginata (Kishida, 1936) – Taiwan, Philippines, Papua New Guinea, Pacifi Is. Introduced to Mexico, Central America, Brazil
 Labahitha nicobarensis (Tikader, 1977) – India (Andaman Is., Nicobar Is.)
 Labahitha oonopiformis (Bristowe, 1938) (type) – Malaysia (Peninsula)
 Labahitha platnicki Magalhaes, Berry, Koh & Gray, 2022 – Papua New Guinea (Bismarck Is.), New Caledonia
 Labahitha ryukyuensis (Ono, 2013) – Japan (Ryukyu Is.)
 Labahitha sundaica (Kulczyński, 1908) – Indonesia (Java)

Lihuelistata

Lihuelistata Ramírez & Grismado, 1997
 L. metamerica (Mello-Leitão, 1940) (type) — Argentina

M

Microfilistata

Microfilistata Zonstein, 1990
 M. magalhaesi Zamani & Marusik, 2018 — Iran
 M. ovchinnikovi Zonstein, 2009 — Turkmenistan
 M. tyshchenkoi Zonstein, 1990 (type) — Tajikistan

Misionella

Misionella Ramírez & Grismado, 1997
 M. aikewara Brescovit, Magalhaes & Cizauskas, 2016 — Brazil
 M. carajas Brescovit, Magalhaes & Cizauskas, 2016 — Brazil
 M. jaminawa Grismado & Ramírez, 2000 — Brazil
 M. mendensis (Mello-Leitão, 1920) (type) — Brazil, Argentina
 M. pallida Brescovit, Magalhaes & Cizauskas, 2016 — Brazil
 † M. didicostae Penney, 2005

P

Pholcoides

Pholcoides Roewer, 1960
 P. afghana Roewer, 1960 (type) — Afghanistan
 P. chiardolae (Caporiacco, 1934) — Pakistan, India
 P. monticola (Spassky, 1941) — Tajikistan
 P. seclusa (O. Pickard-Cambridge, 1885) — India

Pikelinia

Pikelinia Mello-Leitão, 1946
Pikelinia aikewara (Brescovit, Magalhaes & Cizauskas, 2016) – Brazil
Pikelinia arenicola Lise, Ferreira & Silva, 2010 – Brazil
Pikelinia brevipes (Keyserling, 1883) – Peru
Pikelinia carajas (Brescovit, Magalhaes & Cizauskas, 2016) – Brazil
Pikelinia colloncura Ramírez & Grismado, 1997 – Argentina
Pikelinia fasciata (Banks, 1902) – Ecuador (Galapagos Is.)
Pikelinia jaminawa (Grismado & Ramírez, 2000) – Peru, Bolivia, Brazil
Pikelinia kiliani Müller, 1987 – Colombia
Pikelinia kolla Ramírez & Grismado, 1997 – Argentina
Pikelinia mahuell Ramírez & Grismado, 1997 – Argentina
Pikelinia mendensis (Mello-Leitão, 1920) – Brazil, Paraguay, Argentina
Pikelinia milloti (Zapfe, 1961) – Chile
Pikelinia pallida (Brescovit, Magalhaes & Cizauskas, 2016) – Brazil
Pikelinia patagonica (Mello-Leitão, 1938) – Argentina
Pikelinia puna Ramírez & Grismado, 1997 – Argentina
Pikelinia roigi Ramírez & Grismado, 1997 – Argentina
Pikelinia tambilloi (Mello-Leitão, 1941) (type) – Argentina
Pikelinia ticucho Ramírez & Grismado, 1997 – Argentina
Pikelinia uspallata Grismado, 2003 – Argentina

Pritha

Pritha Lehtinen, 1967
 P. albimaculata (O. Pickard-Cambridge, 1872) — Israel
 P. ampulla Wang, 1987 — China
 P. bakeri (Berland, 1938) — Vanuatu
 P. beijingensis Song, 1986 — China
 P. condita (O. Pickard-Cambridge, 1873) — Azores, St. Helena
 P. crosbyi (Spassky, 1938) — Azerbaijan, Kazakhstan, Central Asia
 P. debilis (Simon, 1911) — Algeria
 P. dharmakumarsinhjii Patel, 1978 — India
 P. garciai (Simon, 1892) — Philippines
 P. garfieldi Marusik & Zamani, 2015 — Iran
 P. hasselti (Simon, 1906) — Indonesia (Sumatra, Java, Sulawesi)
 P. heikkii Saaristo, 1978 — Seychelles
 P. hirsuta (O. Pickard-Cambridge, 1872) — Israel
 P. insularis (Thorell, 1891) — India (Nicobar Is.)
 P. littoralis (Roewer, 1938) — New Guinea
 P. marginata (Kishida, 1936) — Taiwan, Japan
 P. nana (Simon, 1868) (type) — Mediterranean, India
 P. napadensis (Patel, 1975) — India
 P. nicobarensis (Tikader, 1977) — India (Andaman Is., Nicobar Is.)
 P. pallida (Kulczyński, 1897) — Madeira, Portugal, Italy, Croatia, Greece, Georgia
 P. parva Legittimo, Simeon, Di Pompeo & Kulczycki, 2017 — France, Italy, Switzerland, Bulgaria
 P. poonaensis (Tikader, 1963) — India
 P. sagittata Legittimo, Simeon, Di Pompeo & Kulczycki, 2017 — Italy, Switzerland, Croatia
 P. spinula Wang, 1987 — China
 P. sundaica (Kulczyński, 1908) — Indonesia (Java)
 P. tenuispina (Strand, 1914) — Israel
 P. vestita (Simon, 1873) — France (Corsica), Bulgaria
 P. zebrata (Thorell, 1895) — Myanmar

S

Sahastata

Sahastata Benoit, 1968
Sahastata amethystina Marusik & Zamani, 2016 – Iran
Sahastata aravaensis (Ganem, Magalhaes, Zonstein & Gavish-Regev, 2022) – Israel, Jordan
Sahastata ashapuriae Patel, 1978 – India
Sahastata bosmansi Zonstein & Marusik, 2019 – Algeria
Sahastata infuscata (Kulczyński, 1901) – Eritrea
Sahastata nigra (Simon, 1897) (type) – Mediterranean to India
Sahastata sabaea Brignoli, 1982 – Yemen
Sahastata sinuspersica Marusik, Zamani & Mirshamsi, 2014 – Iran
Sahastata wesolowskae Magalhaes, Stockmann, Marusik & Zonstein, 2020 – Oman
Sahastata wunderlichi Magalhaes, Stockmann, Marusik & Zonstein, 2020 – Morocco

T

Tricalamus

Tricalamus Wang, 1987
 T. albidulus Wang, 1987 — China
 T. biyun Zhang, Chen & Zhu, 2009 — China
 T. fuscatus (Nakatsudi, 1943) — Palau Is., Japan (Ogasawara Is.)
 T. gansuensis Wang & Wang, 1992 — China
 T. jiangxiensis Li, 1994 — China
 T. lindbergi (Roewer, 1962) — Afghanistan
 T. linzhiensis Hu, 2001 — China
 T. longimaculatus Wang, 1987 — China
 T. longiventris (Yaginuma, 1967) — Japan
 T. menglaensis Wang, 1987 — China
 T. meniscatus Wang, 1987 — China
 T. papilionaceus Wang, 1987 — China
 T. papillatus Wang, 1987 — China
 T. ryukyuensis Ono, 2013 — Japan (Okinawa)
 T. tarimuensis (Hu & Wu, 1989) — China
 T. tetragonius Wang, 1987 (type) — China
 T. xianensis Wang & Wang, 1992 — China
 T. xizanensis (Hu, Hu & Li, 1987) — China

W

Wandella

Wandella Gray, 1994
 W. alinjarra Gray, 1994 — Australia (Northern Territory)
 W. australiensis (L. Koch, 1873) — Australia (Queensland)
 W. barbarella Gray, 1994 (type) — Australia (Western Australia)
 W. centralis Gray, 1994 — Australia (Western Australia, Northern Territory, South Australia)
 W. diamentina Gray, 1994 — Australia (Queensland, South Australia)
 W. grayi Magalhaes, 2016 — Australia (Queensland)
 W. infernalis Magalhaes, 2016 — Australia (Western Australia)
 W. murrayensis Gray, 1994 — Australia (South Australia, New South Wales, Victoria, Western Australia)
 W. orana Gray, 1994 — Australia (New South Wales, Queensland)
 W. pallida Gray, 1994 — Australia (Western Australia)
 W. parnabyi Gray, 1994 — Australia (Western Australia, Northern Territory)
 W. stuartensis Gray, 1994 — Australia (Western Australia, South Australia, New South Wales, Queensland)
 W. waldockae Gray, 1994 — Australia (Western Australia)

Y

Yardiella

Yardiella Gray, 1994
 Y. humphreysi Gray, 1994 (type) — Australia (Western Australia)

Z

Zaitunia

Zaitunia Lehtinen, 1967
 Z. afghana (Roewer, 1962) — Afghanistan
 Z. akhanii Marusik & Zamani, 2015 — Iran
 Z. alexandri Brignoli, 1982 — Iran
 Z. annulipes (Kulczyński, 1908) — Cyprus
 Z. beshkentica (Andreeva & Tystshenko, 1969) — Tajikistan
 Z. brignoliana Zonstein & Marusik, 2016 — Iran
 Z. darreshurii Zamani & Marusik, 2018 — Iran
 Z. ferghanensis Zonstein & Marusik, 2016 — Kyrgyzstan, Uzbekistan
 Z. feti Zonstein & Marusik, 2016 — Turkmenistan
 Z. halepensis Zonstein & Marusik, 2016 — Syria
 Z. huberi Zonstein & Marusik, 2016 — Afghanistan
 Z. inderensis Ponomarev, 2005 — Kazakhstan
 Z. kunti Zonstein & Marusik, 2016 — Cyprus, Turkey
 Z. logunovi Zonstein & Marusik, 2016 — Kazakhstan, Kyrgyzstan
 Z. maracandica (Charitonov, 1946) — Uzbekistan
 Z. martynovae (Andreeva & Tystshenko, 1969) — Tajikistan
 Z. medica Brignoli, 1982 — Iran
 Z. minoica Zonstein & Marusik, 2016 — Greece (Crete)
 Z. minuta Zonstein & Marusik, 2016 — Uzbekistan
 Z. persica Brignoli, 1982 — Iran
 Z. psammodroma Zonstein & Marusik, 2016 — Turkmenistan
 Z. rufa (Caporiacco, 1934) — Pakistan, India
 Z. schmitzi (Kulczyński, 1911) (type) — Egypt, Israel
 Z. spinimana Zonstein & Marusik, 2016 — Kazakhstan, Turkmenistan
 Z. vahabzadehi Zamani & Marusik, 2016 — Iran
 Z. wunderlichi Zonstein & Marusik, 2016 — Kyrgyzstan
 Z. zagrosica Zamani & Marusik, 2018 — Iran
 Z. zonsteini Fomichev & Marusik, 2013 — Kazakhstan

References

Filistatidae